François Keller (born 27 October 1973) is a French retired footballer who now works as head coach of RC Strasbourg Alsace B in his home country.

Career

Keller started his senior career with SR Colmar. in 1998, he signed for Fulham in the Football League Second Division, where he made two appearances and scored zero goals. After that, he played for French club RC Strasbourg Alsace B before retiring in 2003.

References

External links 
 Francois Keller, profession éducateur 
 François Keller at Ligue de Football Professionnel
 François Keller at Footballdatabase.eu

Living people
1973 births
Association football midfielders
Association football defenders
Fulham F.C. players
RC Strasbourg Alsace managers
French football managers
RC Strasbourg Alsace players
French footballers
SR Colmar players
French expatriate footballers
Expatriate footballers in England